Mini Transat 6.50 also known by a number of alternatives Mini, Class Mini, Transat 650  is a development measurement controlled offshore sailing primarily used for racing in the Mini Transat Race hence the name.

Background

History
The Classe Mini conceiver around the Mini Transat race is run bi-annually and first took place in 1977. The race is a solo transatlantic yacht race. The class rules focus on this event and encourage development while controlling both costs and design and fitout safety requirements. The size of the boat allows for more experimentation in design without the costs of larger classses.

Class Association
The class association is an owner led organization that administers the rules and co-ordinates a series of single and double handed events for the class. In response to the perceived challenge of sailing small high-performance boats the class has created rigorous trials, equipment, and inspection requirements to add promote safety. The mini Transat class is largely French in its makeup but the class has tried to encourage international entries.

Development

Mini Transat Race Design Influence
Due to the downwind nature of the racing across the Atlantic Ocean designs tend to be beamy, being nearly half as wide as it is long. The wide flat stern is designed to promote planing similar to a surfboard. As a consequence of the wide beam twin rudders are pretty much standard so that one rudder remains in the water when heeled.

Canting Keels
The class led the way with canting keels – due to their small size there is a design requirement for them to be self-righting when capsized.

Scow Hull Form
The constraint of the box rule led to the introduction of the Scow hull form when David Raison's Mini used the hull shape to win 2011 victory, which may in fact, revolutionize open ocean racing if not sailing altogether. This design trend has now influenced the design of both the Class40 and IMOCA 60 class.

Foiling
The Magnum began an even more radical 'semi-flying' scow that uses a host of design tricks, including wings/foils and a telescopic canting keel, a retractable bowsprit and an Asymmetrical spinnaker, has been designed in France. This has led on to the launch of a fully foiling boats with a production foiling mini transat from pogo being launched in 2020.

Division
There are two divisions:

Prototype
The prototype division is more liberal with respect to dimensions, such as keel depth and mast height, and it allows for advanced technology such as "canting" keels and carbon-fibre masts. The prototype class is approximately 7% faster.

Series (Production)
Production boats use approved designs and comparatively conservative materials.

References

Development sailing classes
Keelboats